This article contains a list of the members of the Utagawa school of Japanese artists, whose members designed paintings and woodblock prints in the ukiyo-e style from the late Edo period to the end of the Meiji period.

Naming 
The art-names of the artists were not produced through a consistent scheme.

The artists of the second generation generally formed their art-names by taking the first kanji of their teacher's name, and adding a different second kanji (e.g. Toyoharu, whose student was Toyohiro). Beginning with the third generation, the names were mainly created by starting with the second kanji of the teacher's name, and adding another one to it (e.g. Toyokuni and his student Kunisada). However, in some cases during this stage the first kanji of the teacher's name was still used for the creation of name (e.g. Toyokuni and Toyoshige). Another, rare, variant was the use of the second kanji of the teacher's name as the second kanji of the pupil's name (e.g. Toyohiro and Naohiro).

Occasionally the same art-name would be re-used by different, un-related artists at different times (e.g. Kunichika or Kunihisa). Equally possible was the use of homonymic names – ones which sound the same, but are written with different kanji (e.g. Hiromasa (広昌) and Hiromasa (広政)).

After an event which left a teacher's name unused, such as their death, retreat from artistic life, or a change in the art-name they used, the former name was often given to a preferred student. Therefore, some names continued to be used, with numbering to distinguish the various holders (e.g. Kuniteru I, II and III). Sometimes these numbers were used by the artists themselves, and sometimes they have been added much later, by people studying the field.

An especially confusing case is the sequence of holders of the name "Toyokuni". After Toyokuni I's death, the name initially was taken over by his student and adoptive son Toyoshige I. It was not used again until Kunisada I started using it in 1844. Kunisada I actually styled himself 'Toyokuni II', ignoring the fact that Toyoshige had already been the second user of the name; he is now uniformly known as 'Toyokuni III', however. His prior art-name, Kunisada, he gave to his son-in-law and adoptive son Kunimasa III, who became now Kunisada II from 1850 onwards. After Kunisada I's death, from about 1870 onwards Kunisada II called himself Toyokuni III (although we now label him Toyokuni IV – the numbering clash caused by Kunisada I's adoption of the name "Toyokuni II" continued to cause confusion), and he handed over the name Kunisada to Kunimasa IV (who thus became Kunisada III). The latter never used the name Toyokuni (although it sometimes alleged that he did so). The literature now indicates the following consecutive holders of these names (with the names they used given in sequence for each one, and using modern numbering for the users of the name "Toyokuni"):

 Toyokuni I 
 Toyoshige I / Toyokuni II 
 Kunisada I / Toyokuni III 
 Kunimasa III / Kunisada II / Toyokuni IV 
 Kunimasa IV / Kunisada III / Kōchōrō / Hōsai

Some names used by Utagawa-school artists were also used by artists from other schools (e.g. Toyonobu, Shigenobu, Kunihiro e.a.), so the art-name alone is not sufficient for identification; the school name has to be added for an exact designation.

Table explanation

Founder: Utagawa Toyoharu I (歌川 豊春; 1735–1814)

The left column contains the names of Toyoharu I's students; below and to the right are the names of their students. This pattern is repeated in turn, for their students. For example, Toyohiro in the first column is the teacher of the artists Hirochika through Toyokuma in the second column, and Hiroshige I in the second column is the teacher of the artists Hirokage through Shigeyoshi in the third column; etc.

If known, lifetime dates are given; if those are not known, the period of artistic activity is given. No data will indicate that the names are listed in literature but no datable artwork has yet been found.

The list also includes the names of several female artists; their names are specially marked. In general they were daughters who were taught to draw by their fathers, and were occasionally allowed to design cartouche images for their fathers' works, which they then signed with her own names.

This list is not totally complete: artists of the fifth generation are only partially listed, and artists of the sixth generation are omitted entirely.

About half of the listed names cannot be found in Western literature; the list originates from a Japanese Internet-based project, the Ukiyo-e-shi sōran (浮世絵師総覧, 'Comprehensive Bibliography of Ukiyo-e Artists').

Table

Notes

References 
 Richard Lane: Images from the Floating World. Fribourg, 1978, 
 Amy Reigle Newland (Hrsg.): The Hotei Encyclopedia of Japanese Woodblock Prints. 2 vol., Amsterdam, 2005, 
 Laurance P. Roberts: A Dictionary of Japanese Artists, Weatherhill, Tokyo and New York, 1976 and 1990, 
 Friedrich B. Schwan: Handbuch Japanischer Holzschnitt. Hintergründe, Techniken, Themen und Motive. Iudicium, München 2003,  (German)

Utagawa
Schools of Japanese art